Robert J. Dalessandro (born 1958, in New York, New York) is an American historian and author who has written and presented extensively on the American Expeditionary Forces contributions to the First World War.

Dalessandro is a retired Colonel in the U.S. Army and the Deputy Secretary of the American Battle Monuments Commission He is former Director of the United States Army Center of Military History at Fort Lesley J. McNair, Washington, D.C. Dalessandro frequently leads battlefield tours to sites in the United States, France and Italy.

Education 
Dalessandro graduated from the Virginia Military Institute with a degree in History in 1980. His graduate studies included work at the College of William and Mary, the U.S. Army War College and George Washington University.

Military career
He has had a wide variety of Army leadership and staff assignments including time as a platoon leader, command at company, depot and battalion level and staff assignments at echelons of command ranging from battalion through Department of the Army level.

Writing and political career
Dalessandro is widely published on the lifeways and material culture of the American Soldier in the eighteenth, nineteenth, and twentieth centuries.  He is co-author of the Organization and Insignia of the American Expeditionary Forces, 1917–1923, he serves as editor of the Army Officer’s Guide, co-author of Willing Patriots: Men of Color in the First World War, and Contributions of African American Soldiers and the American Lions: the 332nd Infantry Regiment in Italy in World War I.

His book, Organization and Insignia of the American Expeditionary Forces, 1917–1923 received the Army Historical Foundation award for excellence in writing.

Dalessandro is the former Chairman of the United States World War One Centennial Commission.  He assumed those duties following the untimely death of former Congressman Michael Turtleton. He was appointed to the commission by the House Minority Leader, Congresswoman Nancy Pelosi of California.

Published works
 Organization and Insignia of the American Expeditionary Force, 1917–1923, Atglen, PA: Schiffer Publishing, 2008  
The Army Officer's Guide, Mechanicsburg, PA: Stackpole, 2009, 2013, 2016
Willing Patriots: Men of Color in the First World War, Atglen, PA: Schiffer Publishing, 2009, 
American Lions: The 332nd Infantry regiment in Italy in World War I, Atglen, PA: Schiffer Publishing, 2010, 
100 Greatest Military Photographs, Atlanta, GA: Whitman Publishing, 2013, 
The Great War, A World War I Historical Collection, Atlanta, GA: Whitman Publishing, 2013, 
 with Rebecca S. Dalessandro, Over There: America in the Great War, Mechanicsburg, PA: Stackpole, 2015, 
 with Robert K. Sutton, Editors, "World War I Remembered", Fort Washington, PA: Eastern National, 2017, 
 Editor "World War I Battlefield Companion", Washington, DC: American Battle Monuments Commission, 2018, 
 Editor "American Armies and Battlefields in Europe: World War II" American Battle Monuments Commission, 2019

References

, Office of the Administrative Assistant to the Secretary of the Army Website – – U.S. Army Chief of Military History Biography
Website of the U.S. World War One Centennial Commission

External links

1958 births
Living people
American military historians
American male non-fiction writers
Virginia Military Institute alumni
Historians of World War I
United States Army colonels